A valuer general or valuer-general (plural: valuers general, valuers-general ) is the chief government official in charge of the land valuation system in their jurisdiction.

Australia 

 Valuer General of New South Wales
 Valuer-General of Norfolk Island
 Valuer General of Queensland
 Valuer General of Victoria
 Valuer-General of South Australia
 Valuer-General of Tasmania
 Valuer-General of Western Australia
 Valuer-General of the Northern Territory

Namibia 

 Valuer-General of Namibia

New Zealand 

 Valuer-General of New Zealand

Papua New Guinea 

 Valuer General of Papua New Guinea

South Africa 

 Office of the Valuer-General South Africa

Vanuatu 

 Valuer General of Vanuatu

References 

Valuation professionals
Positions of authority
Land value taxation
Valuers general